Connected: An Autoblogography About Love, Death, & Technology is an autobiographical documentary film directed by Tiffany Shlain, dedicated to her father.  The film unfolds during a year in which technology and science literally become a matter of life and death for the director. As Tiffany's father Dr. Leonard Shlain, MD battles brain cancer and she confronts a high-risk pregnancy, her very understanding of connection is challenged. Using a mix of animation, archival footage, and home movies, Shlain attempts to reveal the ties that link us not only to the people we love but also to the world at large. Connected explores how, after centuries of declaring our independence, it may be time for us to declare our interdependence instead.

The production of the film took four years, and it is Shlain's eighth film. Leonard Shlain died in 2009 and did not see the finished film.

Release
The film premiered at the Sundance Film Festival in January 2011, and opened theatrically in 11 cities including San Francisco, Marin, Berkeley, Monterey, Seattle, Denver, Portland, LA and New York in the fall of 2011 in an exclusive release theatrical tour. In 2012 Connected was selected by the U.S. State Department to tour with The American Film Showcase to represent America. With the American Film Showcase, the film was sent to embassies around the world and Director Tiffany Shlain traveled to South Africa and Israel to screen the film and teach filmmaking workshops. In Tiffany Shlain's AOL Original series, The Future Starts Here there is an episode in Season 2 called Punk Rock Diplomacy that takes you behind the scenes on her tour with the American Film Showcase. Connected aired on KQED in 2013 and is now available on DVD and digital platforms including iTunes, Netflix and more.

Reception
Critical reception has been mixed. The film received  positive reviews on the aggregator Rotten Tomatoes.

Awards and festivals

Connected: An Autoblogography about Love, Death & Technology (2011)
Sundance Film Festival in 2011
2013: Best Documentary - Mumbai Women's International Film Festival
2013: Best Feature Film - Big Easy Int'l Film and Music Festival
2012: Disruptive Innovation Award - Tribeca Film Festival
2012: Award of Excellence - Accolade Competition
2012: Selected by the United States Department of State & University of Southern California for the 2012 American Filmmaker Showcase
2012: Best Documentary Feature - Atlanta International Documentary Film Festival
2012: 4 Awards from The Los Angeles Movie Awards (Best in Show, Best Feature Doc, Best Director, Best Visual Effects)
2012: Broadcast on Australian TV
2011: Interdependence Film Prize - Berlin Film Festival & The Interdependence Movement
2011: Women in Film Award - All Roads Grant National Geographic Society / Sundance Film Festival
2011: Women of Vision Nomination - L'Oréal / Entertainment Weekly / Sundance Film Festival
2011: Best Documentary Audience Award - Maui Film Festival
2011: Best of the Fest Documentary Award - Portland Maine Film Festival
2011: Metta Media Award - Dallas Video Fest
2011: Honorable Mention - Jerusalem Film Festival
Connected screened at over 100 festivals between 2011 and 2014, including Sundance Film Festival, Ashland Independent Film Festival, Maui Film Festival, Jerusalem Film Festival, Cleveland International Film Festival, and Nashville Film Festival
The Margaret Herrick Library of the Academy of Motion Picture Arts and Sciences acquired the script for Connected for their permanent collection

References

External links

James Greenberg, Hollywood Reporter review (January 29, 2011)

2011 films
American documentary films
Documentary films about the Internet
2011 documentary films
2010s English-language films
2010s American films